The Secret Life of Elephants is a BBC nature documentary series following the lives of elephants and the work of the conservation charity Save the Elephants in Samburu National Reserve, Kenya. It was first transmitted in the United Kingdom on BBC One in January 2009 to 4.2 million viewers.

The three part series follows the lives of African elephants in Samburu, Northern Kenya, focusing on the stories of individual elephants to show the most dramatic moments of their lives. Their hidden world is revealed, from the complexities of family life and their intelligence to the depth of their emotions. The series also follows the work of father and daughter Iain and Saba Douglas-Hamilton and their Save the Elephants team, which includes tracking elephants, fitting tracking collars and developing the relationship between humans and elephants.

DVD 
The series was released on DVD by BBC Worldwide on 9 February 2009.

References

External links
 
 Save the Elephants

2009 British television series debuts
2009 British television series endings
Nature educational television series
BBC television documentaries
Television series about elephants
Animal Planet original programming